A secondary forest (or second-growth forest) is a forest or woodland area which has re-grown after a timber harvest or clearing for agriculture, until a long enough period has passed so that the effects of the disturbance are no longer evident. It is distinguished from an old-growth forest (primary or primeval forest), which has not recently undergone such disruption, and complex early seral forest, as well as third-growth forests that result from harvest in second growth forests. Secondary forest regrowing after timber harvest differs from forest regrowing after natural disturbances such as fire, insect infestation, or windthrow because the dead trees remain to provide nutrients, structure, and water retention after natural disturbances. However, often after natural disturbance the timber is harvested and removed from the system, in which case the system more closely resembles secondary forest rather than seral forest.

Description 
Depending on the forest, the development of primary characteristics may take anywhere from a century to several millennia. Hardwood forests of the eastern United States, for example, can develop primary characteristics in one or two generations of trees, or 150–500 years. Often the disruption is the result of human activity, such as logging, but natural phenomena that produce the same effect are often included in the definition.
Secondary forests tend to have trees closer spaced than primary forests and contain less undergrowth than primary forests.  Secondary forests typically were thought to lack biodiversity compared to primary forests, however this has been challenged in recent years. Usually, secondary forests have only one canopy layer, whereas primary forests have several.

Secondary forestation is common in areas where forests have been lost by the slash-and-burn method, a component of some shifting cultivation systems of agriculture. Secondary forests may also arise from forest that has been harvested heavily or over a long period of time, forest that is naturally regenerating from fire and from abandoned pastures or areas of agriculture.  It takes a secondary forest typically forty to 100 years to begin to resemble the original old-growth forest; however, in some cases a secondary forest will not succeed, due to erosion or soil nutrient loss in certain tropical forests.

Secondary forests re-establish by the process of succession.  Openings created in the forest canopy allow sunlight to reach the forest floor.  An area that has been cleared will first be colonized by pioneer species.  Even though some species loss may occur with primary forest removal, a secondary forest can protect the watershed from further erosion and provides habitat.  Secondary forests may also buffer edge effects around mature forest fragments and increase connectivity between them.  They may also be a source of wood and other forest products.

Today most of the forests of the United States- especially in the eastern part of North America, as well as forests of Europe consist of secondary forest.

When forests are harvested, they either regenerate naturally or artificially (by planting and seeding select tree species).  The result is a second growth forest which is less biodiverse than the old growth forest.  In order to increase the biodiversity, it is possible to create low to moderate disturbances.  Examples of these could be felling certain trees, damaging the tree trunks, and the creating small controlled burns.  Low to moderate disturbances have been shown to be extremely beneficial to increase in biodiversity in secondary forests. These secondary disturbances can clear the canopies to encourage lower canopy growth as well as provide habitats for small organisms such as insects, bacteria and fungi which may feed on the decaying plant material.

Rainforests 
In the case of semi-tropical rainforests, where soil nutrient levels are characteristically low, the soil quality may be significantly diminished following the removal of primary forest. In Panama, growth of new forests from abandoned farmland exceeded loss of primary rainforest in 1990. However, due to the diminished quality of soil, among other factors, the presence of a significant majority of primary forest species fail to recover in these second-growth forests.

See also 
 Land use, land-use change and forestry
 Land use
Overlogging

Notes

References 
CIFOR Secondary Forest
FAO Forestry
World Resource Institute

External links 
M. van Breugel, 2007, Dynamics of secondary forests. PhD Thesis Wageningen University. 
Uzay. U Sezen, 2007, Parentage analysis of a regenerating palm tree in a tropical second-growth forest. Ecological Society of America, Ecology 88: 3065-3075.
Rozendaal et al., 2019, Biodiversity recovery of Neotropical secondary forests Science Advances, 2019-03-06

Forest ecology
Forests
Reforestation
Environmental issues with forests